Rilla Moran Woods (1924-2011) was the first elected president of The National Federation of Democratic Women and the first woman to serve as Director of Public Affairs for the United States General Services Administration.

References 

American feminists
American women in politics
Democratic Party (United States) politicians